Plattville Township is a township in Mills County, Iowa, USA.

History
Early county records are incomplete. Plattville Township was organized in the early 1850s.

References

Townships in Mills County, Iowa
Townships in Iowa